Rodrigo Neves de Freitas (born February 4, 1981), known as Guarú, is a Brazilian footballer who plays as midfielder.

Career statistics

References

External links

1981 births
Living people
Brazilian footballers
Association football midfielders
Esporte Clube São Bento players
Clube Atlético Penapolense players